Yanurusovo (Yänırıś) is a rural locality (a selo) and the administrative centre of Yanurusovsky Selsoviet, Ishimbaysky District, Bashkortostan, Russia. The population was 748 as of 2010. There are 8 streets.

Geography 
Yanurusovo is located 49 km northeast of Ishimbay (the district's administrative centre) by road. Kiyaukovo is the nearest rural locality.

References 

Rural localities in Ishimbaysky District